Qaret Zumaq is a small town in western Egypt. It is located in the Matruh Governorate.

Populated places in Matrouh Governorate